J.A.C.E. (Just Another Confused Elephant) is a 2011 Greek drama film directed by Menelaos Karamaghiolis. It was screened in the City To City section at the 2013 Toronto International Film Festival.

Cast
 Stefania Goulioti as Maria
 Alban Ukaj as Jace
 Kora Karvouni as Alma
 Ieronymos Kaletsanos as Antonio
 Minas Hatzisavvas as Officer Dimitriou
 Yannis Tsortekis as Thomas Tepelenis
 Akilas Karazisis as Dr. Markos Kruger
 Diogo Infante as Nikolas
 Franco Trevisi as Andrei
 Christos Loulis as Father
 Argyris Xafis as Angelos Karras
 Kostas Berikopoulos as Officer Banias

Awards
Stefania Goulioti won the Best Actress award at Thessaloniki Film Festival. Menelaos Karamaghiolis was nominated for Tokyo Grand Prix at the Tokyo International Film Festival.

References

External links
 

2011 films
2011 drama films
Greek drama films
Incest in film
2010s Greek-language films
Greek LGBT-related films
2011 LGBT-related films
LGBT-related drama films